Ricengo is a comune (municipality) in the Province of Cremona in the Italian region Lombardy, located about  east of Milan and about  northwest of Cremona.

Ricengo borders the following municipalities: Camisano, Casale Cremasco-Vidolasco, Casaletto di Sopra, Crema, Offanengo, Pianengo, Sergnano.

References

Cities and towns in Lombardy